Chiswell is a surname. Notable people with the surname include:

David Chiswell, British businessman
James Chiswell (born 1964), British Army general
Peter Chiswell (1934–2013), Australian Anglican bishop
Richard Chiswell (1673–1751), English merchant and politician
Trench Chiswell (died 1797), English antiquary and politician

See also
Criswell (disambiguation)